Shayne Burgess (born 1 June 1964) is an English former professional darts player who competed in Professional Darts Corporation (PDC) tournaments. He is known for his unorthodox throwing action, where he draws the point of the dart up close to his eyeball before releasing.

Career

Early career
Burgess reached the quarter finals of the British Open in 1992 and the quarter-finals of the Winmau World Masters in 1993. Burgess switched to the PDC (then known as the WDC), and reached the semi finals of the 1994 World Matchplay in his first televised event in the WDC.

Peak years
He reached the semi finals of the 1999 PDC World Championship, when he lost a 4-5 in to Peter Manley, and the quarter finals of the 2000 PDC World Championship. Burgess also finished as runner-up in both the 1999 and 2000 World Grand Prixs, losing to Phil Taylor in both finals.

Aside from achieving a 9-dart finish at the Eastbourne Pro event in February 2001, Burgess' form declined for a couple of years after his 1998-2000 peak. However, Burgess then suddenly reached the final of the inaugural UK Open in 2003, again losing to Taylor.

Return to BDO
In 2008, after years of a big decline in his form, Burgess left the PDC circuit. In 2011, Burgess was playing on the BDO circuit, and he hit the second 9-dart finish of his career in September 2012, during a Sussex Super League game. Burgess continues to play for the Hastings team of the Sussex Superleague's East Division, along with fellow former PDC player Adrian Gray.

World Championship Results

BDO

 1994: 1st Round (lost to Steve McCollum 0-3)

PDC

 1995: Last 24 group (lost to Eric Bristow 0–3 and lost to Rod Harrington 2–3)
 1996: Last 24 group (lost to Phil Taylor 0–3 and beat Cliff Lazarenko 3–1)
 1997: Last 24 group (beat Rod Harrington 3–2 and lost to Sean Downs 1–3)
 1998: Quarter-final (lost to Phil Taylor 0–4)
 1999: Semi-final (lost to Peter Manley 4–5)
 2000: Quarter-final (lost to Dennis Priestley 4–5)
 2001: 1st round (lost to Roland Scholten 0–3)
 2002: 2nd round (lost to Phil Taylor 1–6)
 2003: 2nd round (lost to Roland Scholten 1–4)

Source:

Career finals

PDC major finals: 3 (3 runners-up)

Performance timeline

References

External links
Darts Database profile

English darts players
1964 births
Living people
Professional Darts Corporation former pro tour players
British Darts Organisation players